Mikoyan cutlet was a Soviet semi-processed ground meat cutlet variety on the basis of American hamburger beef patty, nicknamed after Soviet politician Anastas Mikoyan. In 1964, The New York Times reported that the Mikoyan cutlet was "the cheapest, most popular if not most revered piece of meat a few kopecks can buy".

History
In 1936, Anastas Mikoyan, who at the time was People's Commissar of Food Industry of the USSR, went on a trip to the United States to boost economic cooperation and study the development of the US economy. During his visit to the United States Mikoyan studied the system of Macy's department store in New York. There Mikoyan took notice of the mass production of hamburger patties and ordered 22 hamburger-producing appliances. However, due to the subsequent World War II, the production of patties in the Soviet Union failed and the so-called Mikoyan cutlets appeared instead. The cutlets were usually made of pork or beef. Some varieties bore names of well known Russian restaurant dishes, such as Kiev cutlets or Pozharsky cutlets, but their ingredients had little in common with the original dishes. While Mikoyan cutlets were mass-produced for ordinary people, being sold from 3 to 5 kopeks each, Mikoyan's factories supplied the Soviet government with first-class sausages, hams and other delicacies.

The name "Mikoyan cutlets" still circulated occasionally in the beginning of perestroika.

See also

 The Book of Tasty and Healthy Food
 Khrushchev dough
 Soviet cuisine
 Woolton pie
 List of meat dishes

References

Meat dishes
Soviet cuisine
Economy of the Soviet Union